The Ruins of Waldeck, a spur castle, are located above the river Nagold near the town of Calw, Germany. They appear to be dated from the 12th century, but their exact origin is not well documented. The ruins are within the Black Forest, and the forest has partly covered the site, but there is still a well defined structure, the inside of which can be accessed by foot.

External links
http://www.schwarzaufweiss.de/Schwarzwald/waldeck.htm 

Ruined castles in Germany